Meenmutty Falls is located 29 km from Kalpetta in Wayanad District in the state of Kerala, India.  It is a three-tiered waterfall with a height of 300 metres. Meenmutty is a combination of Malayalam words Meen (fish) and Mutty (blocked). It can be accessed from Mananthavady - Kuttiady road .  Meenmutty waterfalls are dangerous during rainy seasons due to high inflow and many people have drowned since 1991. Meenmutty falls is surrounded by Lush green tea plantations making the hike to the falls a memorable experience to the tourists.

See also
List of waterfalls in India
List of waterfalls in India by height

References

Waterfalls of Kerala
Geography of Wayanad district
Tourist attractions in Wayanad district